Chris Roebuck is a British economist, focusing on leadership and organisational performance. He is an honorary visiting professor of transformational leadership at Cass Business School in London, a position he has held since 2009. He advises organisations on maximising performance through effective leadership, in particular developing entrepreneurial leadership.

Roebuck has held senior human resource and organisational transformation roles at London Underground, KPMG, HSBC, and UBS. In 2009, 2010, 2011, 2013, 2014, 2016, 2017,  2018, 2019 and 2021 he was nominated by HR Magazine as one of HRs Most Influential Thinkers. Roebuck advises the Chartered Management Institute, and the Chartered Institute of Personnel and Development, business groups such as the Corporate Leadership Council, and the media, writing for Newsweek and being quoted in major publications such as The Times, Wall Street Journal and he is interviewed on leadership and business issues by the BBC and other television channels.

Education

Roebuck studied economics and geography at University College London where he chaired the Students Union commercial enterprises committee, whose operations turned over in excess of £1m in 1976 and employed 32 staff. He later chaired the Union Council, overseeing the constitutional governance process, elections, and negotiations with the UCL senior leadership team and provost. Roebuck graduated in 1977.

Military service

Roebuck served with the Royal Engineer sub unit of the University of London Officers' Training Corps and was commissioned into the Territorial Army. During this period he led the team that blew up the 150 ft high chimney at the old pottery at Sandford near Wareham in Dorset to make way for a new housing estate. Roebuck was subsequently commissioned into the regular Army Royal Engineers via the Royal Military Academy Sandhurst. He was the Best Young Officer on his Course at the Royal School of Military Engineering. During his service in Germany, Roebuck developed the modern pipe fascine, now used by the British Army in operations globally to rapidly cross small gaps and obstacles that restrict the mobility of armoured and other units.

Career

After leaving the Army, Roebuck used his knowledge of leadership to help SMEs (small and medium enterprises) develop their leadership capability as he found they often lack resources or knowledge to achieve this. He frequently worked with entrepreneurs, helping them develop better leadership skills. This later fed into his work with larger organisations, particularly UBS, around developing entrepreneurial leadership.

In 1992 he received his MBA from Cass Business School in London. His dissertation on organisational communication was featured in The Times, on BBC Television and was published worldwide in the International Journal of Strategic Management.

In 1999, Roebuck was invited to be a member of an expert panel on improving leadership in British business in order to enhance competitiveness, reporting to the UK government.

At UBS, Roebuck and colleagues led the delivery of a new development and leadership strategy for the bank's top 500 leaders. They subsequently co-ordinated the strategy via the business divisions for the other 70,000 employees. This underpinned a new corporate alignment, culture and brand, improving the bottom line and the position of UBS in the global banking rankings through entrepreneurial leadership. In 2004, he was appointed global head of talent and leadership. The project at UBS progressed well with top management support and, as a result, in 2005 UBS won the title "Best Company for Leaders Europe" and the "Best New Corporate University" awards, the "Corporate University Best Practice" and "Excellence" awards in 2006/2007, and was ranked one of the top 10 best companies in Europe in 2007.

The UBS talent and leadership initiative now forms a key part of a Harvard Business School case study "UBS: Towards the Integrated Firm" on supporting strategic business change, realignment and improvement via talent and leadership activity. This case is also reviewed from the organisational culture and performance perspective.

Roebuck was part of the expert group developing the 2009 report on Employee Engagement "Engaging for Success" for the UK government to improve performance in British business. He also subsequently worked on its implementation. In 2011 he was commissioned by the King's Fund, the UKs leading health sector think tank, to deliver a report and recommendations on developing leadership in the NHS to enhance patient care for their commission to the UK government.

Public speaking and masterclasses

Roebuck presents at corporate leadership and strategy events, international conferences, business schools and to professional and management groups such as NHS chief executives, the Institute of Directors CEO Summit, Confederation of British Industry and the All Party Parliamentary Committee on Management.

Roebuck is asked to present and run masterclasses on leadership and organisational performance focused on his new approach to leadership at international conferences, business schools and to professional and management groups such as NHS chief executives, the Institute of Directors CEO Summit, Confederation of British Industry, the All Party Parliamentary Committee on Management

Publications

Roebuck has written books on leadership, communication and delegation. His book on "hands-on" leadership was a global bestseller, translated into 11 languages and was used as a best practice guide by the American Management Association.

He had regular columns in CEO and HR magazines for a number of years and has written for publications such as Health Service Journal, Governance magazine, Management Today, The Law Society Gazette, Chartered Institute of Management Accountants Magazine, and other business titles.

His work has been quoted globally, for example in the UK national press, Financial Times, The Wall Street Journal, The Washington Post, Time, Chicago Tribune, Huffington Post, Le Monde, Times of India, Vancouver Sun and more than 50 other business titles.

In May 2014, Roebuck published a combined guide to both organisational and individual leadership introducing a new model of leadership in his new book Lead to Succeed - The Only Leadership Book You Need.

Honours
In December 2011, Roebuck became a Freeman of the City of London.

References

Living people
Alumni of University College London
Alumni of Bayes Business School
Academics of Bayes Business School
Human resource management people
Graduates of the Royal Military Academy Sandhurst
Year of birth missing (living people)